The Nottingham Challenger (also known as the LTA Nottingham Challenger or LTA Summer Challenger) was an annual tennis tournament played in Nottingham, England. The tournament was part of the ATP Challenger Tour. The tournament was originally held on hard courts in late October before being moved to the beginning of July and grass courts as a follow-up event to the Wimbledon Championships.

Past finals

Singles

Doubles

See also
Nottingham Open (ATP/WTA tournament started in 1970)
Nottingham Trophy (Challenger tournament started in 2009)

References

ATP Challenger Tour
Hard court tennis tournaments
Grass court tennis tournaments
Tennis tournaments in England
Sport in Nottingham
Recurring sporting events established in 2002
2002 establishments in England
Recurring sporting events disestablished in 2007
2007 disestablishments in England